Stockdale Independent School District is a public school district based in Stockdale, Texas (USA) and serves students in east central Wilson County.  In 2009, the school district was rated "recognized" by the Texas Education Agency.

Schools
Stockdale High School
Stockdale Junior High School
Stockdale Elementary School

References

External links
 

School districts in Wilson County, Texas